Mahbouba Seraj (Pashto/Persian: محبوبه سراج)  is an Afghan journalist and women’s right activist.

Early life and career 
Born in 1948 in Kabul, into royal lineage (niece of King Amanullah Khan), Seraj attended Malalai High School and later studied at Kabul University.

In 1978, Seraj and her husband were put in prison by the Communist Party of Afghanistan and later that year declared persona non grata. She then left for the United States, at least initially New York City, and lived there in exile for some 26 years, before returning to Afghanistan in 2003. Following her return, she co-founded a number of organizations to address corruption, women and children’s rights. Most notably as a member of the non-profit Afghan Women’s Network, she has dedicated her cause to championing children’s health, battling corruption and empowering victims of domestic violence. She is the creator and announcer of a radio program for women by the name of “Our Beloved Afghanistan by Mahbouba Seraj” which has been broadcast all over Afghanistan. She has also advocated for women to be part of the political discourse, through a National Action Plan, encouraged by UN Nations.

When the Taliban returned to power in August 2021, Seraj refused to flee the country, deciding to remain in Kabul to continue to work with women and children. In September 2021, she was included in the Time 100, Times annual list of the 100 most influential people in the world.

Recognition 
She was recognized as one of the BBC's 100 women of 2021.

References and footnotes

Footnotes

References

Afghan women activists
Living people
Afghan royalty
1948 births
BBC 100 Women